This timeline summarises significant events in the history of Northumbria and Northumberland.

500
 559 - Ida of Bernicia is the first known King of Bernicia; he reigned from 547 to 559.
 588 - The first king of Deira was Ælla of Deira who ruled from 560 until his death in 588.

600
 604 - Aethelfrith unites Bernicia and Deira to form Northumbria.
 613 - Æthelfrith engaged in the Battle of Chester.
 625 - Paulinus is consecrated as Bishop of York.
 634 - Lindisfarne Priory founded by Irish monk Saint Aidan.
 634/642 - Oswald of Northumbria "reunited the whole of Northumbria".
 638  - Gododdin hillfort at Edinburgh is captured by Oswald of Northumbria (see Northumbrian Edinburgh).
 664 - Synod of Whitby
 664 - Plague in British Isles travels at least as far north as Lastingham.
 674 - Hexham Abbey built.
 685 - Loss to Picts at Battle of Dun Nechtain (Nechtansmere) limits northern expansion.
 687 - Cuthbert, patron saint of Northumbria, dies at his Inner Farne Island hermitage.

700
 709 - Acca is appointed as Bishop of Hexham.
 715 - Eadfrith creates the Lindisfarne Gospels.
 731 - Bede writes the Ecclesiastical History of the English People at Jarrow.
 735 - Alcuin of York is born, later a major figure in the Carolingian Renaissance under Charlemagne.
 793 - Vikings raid Lindisfarne.
 794 - Vikings raid Jarrow.

800
 827 - Northumbria accepts Egbert of Wessex as overlord.
 865 - Northumbrians led by Aelle II defeat Ragnar Lodbrok's raiding Vikings.
 866 - York and southern Northumbria are conquered and settled by the "Great Heathen Army."
 867 - Aelle II and Osberht join forces only to be defeated at the Battle of York.

900
 915 - Ealdred I of Bernicia and Constantine II of Scotland are defeated by Vikings in the first Battle of Corbridge.
 927 - Earldom of Northumbria is created by Athelstan.
 937 - Athelstan defeats Norse-Celtic force in the battle of Brunanburh.
 947/48 - Eric Bloodaxe King of Northumbria.
 952/54 - Eric Bloodaxe King of Northumbria again.
 954
 Edinburgh is lost to Scottish king Indulf.
 Eadred of Wessex permanently "absorbed Northumbria into the English Kingdom."
 993 - Bamburgh Castle destroyed by the Vikings.
 995 - Monks from Lindisfarne establish Durham

1000
 1013 - Uhtred the Bold, ealdorman of all Northumbria submitted to Sweyn Forkbeard as did all of the Danes in the north.
 1018 - Lothian is lost to the King of Scots Malcolm II.
 1041 - Eadwulf, earl of Bamburgh was "betrayed" by king Harthacnut and killed by Siward.
 1065 - The term Northumberland is first recorded in the Anglo-Saxon Chronicle.
 1069 - William I ruthlessly suppresses Northumbrian opposition in the Harrying of the North.
 1072 - William I crosses Northumbria into Scotland, supported by a large fleet, to challenge Malcolm III.
 1080 - Normans fortify a town on the Tyne, thereafter known as Newcastle.
 1089 - Northumberland county is created.
 1091 - Cathedral Church of St Nicholas founded.
 1095 - Prudhoe Castle built (approx date).
 1096 - Alnwick Castle construction begins.

1100
 1121 - Norham Castle construction begins.
 1135 - Brinkburn Priory founded (approx date).
 1137 - Newminster Abbey is founded near Morpeth.
 1139 - Matilda grants Northumberland north of the Tees to David I of Scotland.
 1143 - Castle is built at Northallerton.
 1150 - Warkworth Castle built (approx date).
 1157 - Henry II reclaims Northumberland from Scotland.
 1160 - Castle is built at Norham.
 1174 - While besieging Alnwick, William I of Scotland is captured and imprisoned in Newcastle.
 1177 - The Castle, Newcastle built.

1200
 1216 - King John orders destruction of Berwick-upon-Tweed.
 1237 - The Treaty of York defines the northern border of England and Northumberland county.
 1240 - Hulne Priory founded.
 1250 - Haughton Castle built. (approx date).
 1296 - English force sacks Berwick-upon-Tweed prior to defeating Scots in the Battle of Dunbar
 1297 - Scots led by William Wallace burn Hexham, Corbridge and Ryton.

1300
 1314 - The county was ravaged by Robert the Bruce. 
 1322 - Dunstanburgh Castle built.
 1330 - Peel tower added to Featherstone Castle.
 1333 - Edward III, besieging Berwick-upon-Tweed, defeats Scots in the Battle of Halidon Hill.
 1346 - Scottish force sacks Hexham prior to defeat at the Battle of Neville's Cross.
 1349 - Black Plague
 1370 - Belsay Castle built. (approx date).
 1377 - Henry Percy becomes first Earl of Northumberland.
 1388 - Battle of Otterburn.

1400
 1402 - Battle of Humbleton Hill
 1403 - Henry "Hotspur" Percy is killed at Shrewsbury in battle against Henry IV.
 1450 - Dilston Castle built. (approx date)
 1464 - Battle of Hedgeley Moor
 1482 - Berwick-upon-Tweed last re-captured by England.

1500
 1500 - Birth of Bishop Ridley who was martyred in 1555.
 1513 - English defeat invading Scots at Battle of Flodden Field.
 1549 - John Knox appointed parish minister in Berwick-upon-Tweed.
 1551 - John Dudley becomes first Duke of Northumberland.
 1569 - Earl of Northumberland rebels against Elizabeth I in the Rising of the North.
 1572 - The liberty of Hexham was annexed to Northumberland.
 1597 - Plague kills 340 in Newcastle.

1600
 1603 - Union of crowns under James I
 1606 - James I transports Border Reivers to Ireland in the Plantation of Ulster.
 1640 - Scottish Covenanters defeat English force in the Battle of Newburn
 1649 - 14 women are convicted and executed in Newcastle witch trials.

1700
 1707 - Act of Union joins the Scottish government with that of England and Wales.
 1715 - Birth of Capability Brown in Kirkharle.
 1745 - Scant Northumberland support for Bonnie Prince Charlie in the second Jacobite rising.
 1761 - Troops in Hexham shoot 40 miners protesting against conscription.
 1781 - Birth of George Stephenson in Wylam
 1782 - 5th Regiment of Foot named the 5th (The Northumberland) Regiment of Foot.

1800
 1800 - Bewick publishes British Birds.
 1819 - Newcastle Regiment of Yeomanry Cavalry raised.
 1829 
 Stephenson's Rocket wins the Rainhill Trials.
 Natural History Society of Northumbria founded.
 1838 - Grace Darling rescues survivors from a shipwreck off the Farne Islands.
 1844 - North British Railway operated from 1844 to 1922.
 1853 - Cholera epidemic kills 1,500 in Newcastle.
 1854 - North Eastern Railway incorporated.
 1877 - Rutherford College of Technology founded.
 1891 - Population: 506,442.

1900
 1901 - Population:  603,498.
 1903 - Smallpox epidemic hits Newcastle.
 1936 - Two hundred men march from Jarrow to London to protest about unemployment in the region.
 1940 - Spitfires from RAF Acklington intercept Luftwaffe bombers off the Farne Islands.
 1963 - University of Newcastle upon Tyne is established as separate institution.
 1966 - Epidemic of foot-and-mouth disease strikes Northumberland farms.
 1974 - The county of Tyne and Wear is created.

See also
 History of Northumberland

References

Sources
 Stenton, F. M. (1971). Anglo-Saxon England. Oxford, UK: Oxford University Press.
 Waters, I. (1999). Northumberland: England's Border Country. Contemporary Review, 275(1605), 203–210.

External links
 Timeline of Northeast England
 
 

Northumbria and Northumberland
 Timeline
Regional timelines